Akeem Adeniyi Adeyemi (born 1977) also known as Skimeh is a Nigerian politician. He is a member of the Nigeria Federal House of Representatives representing the Afijio, Oyo West, Oyo East, Atiba West federal constituency. He is the son of the paramount king of Oyo town Oba Lamidi Olayiwola III.

Early life 
His early education came at St Francis nursery and primary school Oyo, St Andrew Demonstration Oyo, and Olivet Baptist High School in Oyo. He earned a bachelor's degree at the University of Benin.

Career 
He chaired the Atiba local government from 2007 to 2010. He served as a caretaker chairman of the Atiba local government 2011 to 2014. In the 2015 general elections, he contested for the federal house of representatives under All Progressives Congress and was elected to represent Afijio, Oyo east, Oyo west and Atiba federal constituency  He was reelected in 2019.

References

1977 births
Living people
21st-century Nigerian politicians
Members of the House of Representatives (Nigeria)